The Writers Guild of America Award for Television: Episodic Drama is an award presented by the Writers Guild of America to the best written episodes of a dramatic television series. It has been presented annually since the 14th annual Writers Guild of America awards in 1962. The years denote when each episode first aired. Though, due to the eligibility period, some nominees could have aired in a different year. The current eligibility period is December 1 to November 30. The winners are highlighted in gold.

Winners and nominees

1960s

1970s

1980s

1990s

2000s

2010s

2020s

Total awards
 NBC – 21
 ABC – 14
 CBS – 11
 AMC – 8
 HBO – 6
 Fox – 3
 Showtime – 2
 Syndicated – 1

Writers with multiple awards

3 awards
 Tom Fontana
 Vince Gilligan

2 awards
 Steven Bochco
 Henry Bromell
 Harlan Ellison
 Debra Frank 
 Georgia Jeffries
 Robert Lewin
 David Milch
 Carl Sautter
 Michael I. Wagner
 Terence Winter

Programs with multiple awards

4 awards
 Hill Street Blues (NBC)

3 awards
 Better Call Saul (AMC)
 Breaking Bad (AMC)
 The Sopranos (HBO)

2 awards
 Cagney & Lacey (CBS)
 Homeland (Showtime)
 Homicide: Life on the Street (NBC)
 House (Fox)
 Judd, for the Defense (ABC)
 Lou Grant (CBS)
 Mad Men (AMC)
 Moonlighting (ABC)
 Naked City (ABC)
 Succession (HBO)
 thirtysomething (ABC)
 The West Wing (NBC)

Writers with multiple nominations

12 nominations
 Steven Bochco
 Tom Fontana

10 nominations
 David Milch

8 nominations
 David E. Kelley
 Jeffrey Lewis

6 nominations
 John Masius
 Thomas Schnauz
 Aaron Sorkin
 John Wells

5 nominations
 Stephen J. Cannell
 Robin Green
 Matthew Weiner

4 nominations
 Mitchell Burgess
 Vince Gilligan
 Michelle King
 Robert King
 Damon Lindelof
 Michael I. Wagner
 Terence Winter
 John Sacret Young

3 nominations
 David Chase
 Michael S. Chernuchin
 Terry Louise Fisher
 Carol Flint
 Mark Frost
 Channing Gibson
 Peter Gould
 Karen Hall
 Gennifer Hutchison
 Paul Redford
 David Simon
 Gordon Smith
 Anthony Yerkovich
 Ed Zuckerman

2 nominations
 Neal Baer
 Rene Balcer
 David Benioff
 Harve Bennett
 William Blinn
 Alan Brennert
 Jim Byrnes
 Rick Cleveland
 John T. Dugan
 John Dunkel
 Harlan Ellison
 Pat Fielder
 William M. Finkelstein
 Debra Frank
 Eboni Freeman
 Leonard Freeman
 Russel Friend
 Bruce Geller
 Michael Gleason
 Gary David Goldberg
 Mel Goldberg
 Walon Green
 Earl Hamner
 Georgia Jeffries

 Ernest Kinoy
 Howard Korder
 Richard Kramer
 Anthony Lawrence
 Joanna Lee
 Peter Lefcourt
 Garrett Lerner
 Robert Lewin
 David Lloyd
 Heather Marion
 George Mastras
 John McGreevey
 David Mills
 Lawrence O'Donnell
 Ron Osborn
 Jeff Reno
 Mark Rodgers
 Carl Sautter
 April Smith
 D.B Weiss
 Dick Wolf
 Lydia Woodward
 James Yoshimura

Programs with multiple nominations

15 nominations
 Hill Street Blues (NBC)

14 nominations
 Breaking Bad (AMC)
 Lou Grant (CBS)

11 nominations
 Better Call Saul (AMC)
 The West Wing (NBC)

9 nominations
 Law & Order (NBC)
 The Sopranos (HBO)
 The Waltons (CBS)

8 nominations
 Homicide: Life on the Street (NBC)

7 nominations
 China Beach (ABC)
 Mad Men (AMC)
 St. Elsewhere (NBC)
 thirtysomething (ABC)

6 nominations
 Cagney & Lacey (CBS)
 L.A. Law (NBC)

5 nominations
 ER (NBC)
 Gunsmoke (CBS)
 Moonlighting (ABC)
 The Rockford Files (NBC)

4 nominations
 Boardwalk Empire (HBO)
 The Good Wife (CBS)
 Hawaii Five-O (CBS)
 House (Fox)
 Judd, for the Defense (ABC)
 Naked City (ABC)
 This Is Us (NBC)

3 nominations
 Ben Casey (ABC)
 Columbo (NBC)
 The Defenders (CBS)
 Dexter (Showtime)
 Game of Thrones (HBO)
 Homeland (Showtime)
 I'll Fly Away (NBC)
 Lost (ABC)
 Marcus Welby, M.D. (ABC)
 McCloud (NBC)
 The Mod Squad (ABC)
 Northern Exposure (CBS)
 NYPD Blue (ABC)
 Ozark (Netflix)
 Six Feet Under (HBO)
 Star Trek (NBC)

2 nominations
 Big Love (HBO)
 Bracken's World (NBC)
 Channing (ABC)
 CSI: Crime Scene Investigation (CBS)
 The Fugitive (ABC)
 The Handmaid's Tale (Hulu)
 Law & Order: Special Victims Unit (NBC)
 The Leftovers (HBO)
 M*A*S*H (CBS)
 Picket Fences (CBS)
 Route 66 (CBS)
 Slattery's People (CBS)
 Succession (HBO)
 The OA (Netflix)
 The Streets of San Francisco (ABC)
 The Virginian (NBC)

Footnotes

References

Screenplay